In Greek mythology, Lernus (Ancient Greek: Λέρνου) may refer to the following individuals:

 Lernus, son of Proetus of Nauplia and father of Naubolus.
 Lernus, the Olenian father of  Palaemon, one of the Argonauts. The latter was also called the son of Aetolus or Hephaestus
 Lernus, the Rhodian father by Amphiale of Cleodorus, one of the Achaean soldiers in the Trojan War. This son was slayed with arrows by Paris, son of King Priam and Queen Hecuba of Troy.
 Lernus, a Greek warrior who was killed by the Amazon Queen Penthesilia.

See also 

 List of Trojan War characters

Notes

References 

 Apollodorus, The Library with an English Translation by Sir James George Frazer, F.B.A., F.R.S. in 2 Volumes, Cambridge, MA, Harvard University Press; London, William Heinemann Ltd. 1921. . Online version at the Perseus Digital Library. Greek text available from the same website.
Apollonius Rhodius, Argonautica translated by Robert Cooper Seaton (1853-1915), R. C. Loeb Classical Library Volume 001. London, William Heinemann Ltd, 1912. Online version at the Topos Text Project.
 Apollonius Rhodius, Argonautica. George W. Mooney. London. Longmans, Green. 1912. Greek text available at the Perseus Digital Library.
 Gaius Julius Hyginus, Fabulae from The Myths of Hyginus translated and edited by Mary Grant. University of Kansas Publications in Humanistic Studies. Online version at the Topos Text Project.
 Quintus Smyrnaeus, The Fall of Troy translated by Way. A. S. Loeb Classical Library Volume 19. London: William Heinemann, 1913. Online version at theio.com
 Quintus Smyrnaeus, The Fall of Troy. Arthur S. Way. London: William Heinemann; New York: G.P. Putnam's Sons. 1913. Greek text available at the Perseus Digital Library.

Achaeans (Homer)
Aetolian characters in Greek mythology